Johann "Hans" Schmidradner (born 26 February 1945) is a retired Austrian football defender who played for Austria. He also played for SC Wacker Wien, FK Austria Wien, First Vienna FC, Kickers Offenbach, FV Würzburg 04, Linzer ASK and Wiener Sport-Club.

External links

 
 

1945 births
Austrian footballers
Austria international footballers
Association football defenders
FC Admira Wacker Mödling players
Wiener Sport-Club players
FK Austria Wien players
First Vienna FC players
Kickers Offenbach players
LASK players
Living people
Austrian expatriate footballers
Expatriate footballers in Germany
Austrian expatriate sportspeople in Germany
Austrian Football Bundesliga players
Bundesliga players
2. Bundesliga players